Bremecke may refer to following rivers of North Rhine-Westphalia, Germany:

 Bremecke (Hoppecke), tributary of the Hoppecke
 Bremecke (Möhne), tributary of the Möhne